Alexandru Davila (February 12, 1862 – October 19, 1929) was a Romanian dramatist, diplomat, public administrator, and memoirist.

Biography
The son of Carol Davila, a distinguished military physician of French origin, and Ana Racoviţă (a descendant of the Racoviţă and Golescu boyars), he studied in his native Goleşti and at V. A. Urechia's college in Bucharest, earning his bachelor's degree in Paris.

In the early 1880s, Davila was an attaché for the Romanian legations in Italy and, in 1884, Belgium. Later in the same year, upon his father's death, he returned to his country to serve as police inspector and then as head of the administration in a province of Northern Dobruja.

He took up writing and theater management in the closing years of the 19th century. In 1902, he completed his major work, a drama entitled Vlaicu Vodă (based on the life of a 14th-century Wallachian Prince), one of the first important pieces of its kind in Romanian literature. Between 1905 and 1908, he was the head of the National Theatre Bucharest.

In 1915, a mysterious attempt to have him killed resulted in paralysis — Davila was bedridden for the rest of his life, as a sanatorium patient. An intimate friend of the royal family under Carol I, he left behind his Din torsul zilelor, a memoir of life at the turn of the century (alongside his portrait of Carol, the book is remembered for those of figures such as Take Ionescu, Alexandru Dimitrie Xenopol, and Vasile Morţun).

References
Ioan Lăcustă's foreword to Alexandru Davila, "Din torsul zilelor", fragment published in Magazin Istoric, July 1996

1862 births
1929 deaths
19th-century Romanian civil servants
Chairpersons of the National Theatre Bucharest
Romanian diplomats
Romanian dramatists and playwrights
Romanian memoirists
Romanian police officers
Romanian people of French descent
Romanian people with disabilities
People from Argeș County
People with paraplegia
Prefects of Romania